El Cartel Records (formerly known as Los Cangris Inc. and El Cartel Productions) is a Puerto Rican record company. The release of Barrio Fino, Daddy Yankee's first commercially successful album, is notable for being the label's first distributed album.

Artists

Former artists

Albums

Mixtapes
 2010: Gerry Capo - Bastardo: Mixtape
 2011: Carnal + Los De La Nazza - Carnal (The Mixtape)
 2012: Los De La Nazza - El Imperio Nazza
 2012: Los De La Nazza - El Imperio Nazza: Gold Edition
 2012: Gotay + Los De La Nazza - Imperio Nazza: Gotay Edition
 2012: J Alvarez + Los De La Nazza - Imperio Nazza: J Alvarez Edition
 2013: Jowell & Randy + Los De La Nazza - Imperio Nazza: Doxis Edition 
 2013: Carnal + Los De La Nazza - Carnal: ReenCarnal
 2014: Los De La Nazza - Imperio Nazza: Top Secret Edition

Coming soon

 Daddy Yankee - El Disco Duro (El Cartel Records/EMI/Capitol Latin)

See also
 List of record labels
 Machete Music

References

External links
 
 El Cartel Records at YouTube.

American record labels
Puerto Rican brands
Puerto Rican record labels
Reggaeton record labels
Hip hop record labels
Record labels established in 2004
Vanity record labels